Abdul Qadim Haqq (born December 24, 1968), also known as Haqq and The Ancient,  is an American visual artist who was born and raised in Detroit, Michigan. He is considered Detroit's number one ambassador of art for world-renowned techno music artists. Haqq's artwork is featured worldwide on classic records by Detroit Techno record labels, namely the records of Juan Atkins, Metroplex, Derrick May, Transmat, Underground Resistance, Kevin Saunderson, Carl Craig.  Abdul Qadim Haqq has been serving the techno music community through Techno Visual Art since 1989. His artwork continues to inspire fans all over the world.

Haqq, founder of Third Earth Visual Arts, bases his futuristic concepts on time travel. His love for fantasy art was inspired by childhood pastimes such as watching sci-fi and Japanese animation. "Japanese cartoons were all I watched when I was a kid, like Speed Racer, Battle of the Planets and Robotech," says Haqq. "I watched them constantly; I never missed an episode." As a youth growing up in Detroit, Haqq was often sick from asthma and had to stay in the house, which caused him to spend a considerable portion of his time watching science fiction and fantasy shows on TV. These in turn led him to create and illustrate his own stories. Haqq majored in graphic illustration at the College for Creative Studies, originally called the Center for Creative Studies, in Detroit. After graduating in 1991, he committed himself to working as a futurist artist, and remains dedicated to Detroit Techno Art today. "

Career
Haqq completed his first work for Derrick May's record label Transmat in October 1989. Later that year, Haqq met Mike Banks and UR. "We got our start when Derrick May from Transmat asked us to do artwork for his label. We started doing work there and he liked it, so he let us have a studio in the basement at Metroplex, which he arranged with Juan Atkins. Third Earth Visual Arts was originally four art students, but we all went different paths and I'm the only one who stuck with it for the past 25 years."

After completing art school in 1991, he met Banks and composed his first project for him. He recalls having the same feelings about the sound then and now;  "[the music] always sounded like it was from beyond this world," he says. At the time, UR was new, but the music was already alive. Haqq knew this from his nights spent dancing at the Music Institute, which is burnt into the city's history of computer dance jams. One day, Derrick May skimmed some of his journal entries on Native American rituals and chose some of Haqq's notes on the Lakotah for the backsleeve of his magnum opus, Rhythm is Rhythm's "The Beginning". That instance was just one of the increasing moments of Haqq's eye and eye (third and physical) visions that are evenly building optical rapture.

"Abdul Qadim Haqq & Shinichiro Watanabe Joint Exhibition" held an Art exhibit from April 24, 2010 until August 1, 2010.  The exhibit was opened in the Netherlands at the "GalleryIKOI" and in Tokyo, Japan June 24, 2010, the booklet was published by Storyriders in Japan. To celebrate the publication of the booklet that summarizes this event "Requiem for a Machine Soul" booklet, held at the Kichijoji Club Seata and June 26 at club Seata in Kichijoji, Tokyo.  Abdul Qadim Haqq & Shinichiro Watanabe Joint Exhibition", Paintings and the painter Abdul Qadim Haqq which occupies an important position in the Detroit Techno scene, such as vinyl record/cd jackets and graphic arts.  Abdul Qadim Haqq was newly written for this exhibition, paintings he created to inspired, original stories by Shinichiro Watanabe.

In 2014 Haqq published a book titled, 1989–2014: 25 Years of Techno Art in 2014, featuring photography and illustrations of the Detroit Techno scenes important work including Drexciya, Gerald Mitchell, Dj Rolando, This work contains a comprehensive record of activities and historical documentation that records the Detroit Techno community in one book.

The "Technanomicron" is a 30-paged art book in 10" size entitled "The Rise of the Technolords". It contains abstract illustrations of important artists from Detroit, as well as short biographies written in Abdul's own unique science fiction style of Storytelling.
Prolific and highly respected Detroit techno artist, Abdul Haqq, shares a selection of personal favourites and undisputed Detroit techno classics from the archives of Underground Resistance, Carl Craig, Derrick May, Jeff Mills and Suburban Knight. Over the years, Haqq has undertaken a whole foray of artwork for the aforementioned recording artists and their related labels. He was responsible for producing some of the earlier artwork for Transmat, closely followed by various projects for Planet E, including the well known Intergalactic Beats cover art. Subsequently, Abdul has worked very closely with Underground Resistance and still producing much of their label artwork to this day, remains the key figure in creating the unique imagery for the ultimate techno institution. If you are unfamiliar with Haqq's painting style, then this compilation provides an excellent starting point, for a taster of this artist's work is depicted in the enclosed thirty-two-page artbook. This limited edition includes printed artbook.

References

External links

Third Earth Visual Arts

Detroit Promo TV - Abdul Haqq - Techno Artist
“Techno Art” - Abdul Qadim Haqq meets Techno & Philosophy collective in Detroit for London Art Exhibit
Abdul Qadim Haqq at the Hubb | Birmingham UK for Soul City Arts

Detroit techno
American speculative fiction artists
Futurist artists
African-American artists
Culture of Detroit
Artists from Detroit
Fantasy artists
1968 births
Living people
21st-century African-American people
20th-century African-American people